New Pillow Fight, also titled Daughters' Pillow Fight, is the name of a very early short comedy film, released in 1897.  This scene shows four little girls indulging in a pillow fight. Eventually, the feathers are flying all around.

Cast
Emily Lubin		
Marguerite Sessler

External links

1897 films
American silent short films
American black-and-white films
Lost American films
1897 comedy films
Pillow fight
Silent American comedy films
Lubin Manufacturing Company films
American comedy short films
1890s lost films
1897 short films
1890s American films
Lost comedy films